Theophilus Solomon (born 18 January 1996) is a Nigerian professional footballer who plays as a forward for Kosovan club Gjilani.

Club career

Rijeka
Born in Kaduna, Solomon played at Eco Football Club of Lagos before joining Croatian side Rijeka in June 2012. He signed his first professional contract with the club in January 2014.

Loan to Pomorac
In order to gain some senior football experience, Solomon spent the initial six months of his Rijeka contract on loan at Druga HNL side Pomorac. He appeared in nine games until the end of the 2013–14 campaign, failing to score any goals.

Loan to Zadar
In August 2014, Solomon was loaned to Zadar, alongside Domagoj Pušić, until the end of the 2014–15 season. He scored a hat-trick in the first round of the Croatian Cup, on 24 September, leading his team to a 5–1 away win against Zagora Unešić. On 6 December, Solomon became the youngest foreigner to score a goal in the Prva HNL, netting the opener in an eventual 2–5 home loss to Lokomotiva Zagreb.

Loan to Šibenik
In July 2015, alongside his teammate David Nwolokor, Solomon was sent on a season-long loan to Šibenik. He was the team's top scorer and fourth-highest in the Druga HNL that season with a tally of 11 goals.

Loan to Istra 1961
In July 2016, Solomon went on another season-long loan, this time joining newly promoted Prva HNL side Istra 1961. He finished the campaign with seven goals from 31 appearances, helping his team secure their league status.

Loan to Partizan
On 12 August 2017, Solomon was transferred to Serbian club Partizan on a season-long loan with an option for a permanent transfer.

Loan to Omonia
On 30 January 2018, he was loaned to Omonia until the end of the 2017-18 season. On 10 February he scored his first goal against Aris Limassol.

Inter Zaprešić
On 17 June 2018, Solomon was transferred to Inter Zaprešić as part of player-exchange deal.

International career
In mid-March 2016, Solomon was included in the 20-man Nigeria U23 squad for a friendly against the Brazil U23s scheduled for the 24th in Rio de Janeiro. He came on as a substitute for Stanley Dimgba in the second half of the match, which Nigeria won by 1–0.

References

External links
 
 
 

Association football forwards
Croatian Football League players
First Football League (Croatia) players
Serbian SuperLiga players
Cypriot First Division players
Nemzeti Bajnokság I players
Expatriate footballers in Croatia
Expatriate footballers in Serbia
Expatriate footballers in Cyprus
Expatriate footballers in Hungary
Expatriate footballers in Albania
FK Partizani Tirana players
Újpest FC players
AC Omonia players
FK Partizan players
HNK Rijeka players
HNK Šibenik players
NK Istra 1961 players
NK Pomorac 1921 players
NK Zadar players
NK Inter Zaprešić players
Nigeria youth international footballers
Nigerian expatriate footballers
Nigerian expatriate sportspeople in Croatia
Nigerian expatriate sportspeople in Serbia
Nigerian expatriate sportspeople in Cyprus
Nigerian footballers
Sportspeople from Kaduna
1996 births
Living people
Qadsia SC players
Expatriate footballers in Kuwait
Kuwait Premier League players
Nigerian expatriate sportspeople in Kuwait